John Daniel James was Archdeacon of Llandaff from his appointment in 1930 until his death on 17 January 1938.

He was educated at  Magdalene College, Cambridge and ordained in 1886. After curacies in Llangefni and Abergavenney, he held incumbencies in Goytre and Llwynypia. He was Surrogate for the Diocese of Llandaff from 1895; and Vicar of Cadoxton-juxta-Neath from 1900.

References

1938 deaths
Alumni of Magdalene College, Cambridge
Archdeacons of Llandaff
Year of birth missing